Chhanchhan is an Indian family drama TV series which aired from 25 March 2013 through 19 September 2013 on Sony Entertainment Television India and Sony Entertainment Television Asia from Monday to Thursday. The show was tentatively titled Modern Bahu during pre-production and stars Sanaya Irani, Supriya Pathak, and Anuj Sachdeva.

Plot

Chhanchhan Sarabhai (Sanaya Irani) is a young woman with a modern outlook who lives in Ahmedabad with her family. During the wedding of her friend Poorvi, Chhanchhan meets Umaben, (Supriya Pathak) who is in need of money. Realizing this, they stop the marriage and Umaben starts to hate Chhanchhan. Chhanchhan meets Umaben's son Manav (Farhan Khan), and they also hate each other. Despite their mutual hatred, they develop a friendship and fall in love.

Chhanchhan's family are happy when they learn of the pair's relationship. When Umaben finds out her son is in love with
Chhanchhan, she feigns illness and tells her family she will only recover if Manav marries a girl of her choice. Manav's friend Himanshu says he will arrange for Umaben and Chhanchhan to meet each other so Manav can marry Chhanchhan. They meet at an ashram where Chhanchhan works, and she finds out that Manav is Umaben's son.

When Manav hears that his mother would prefer a traditional daughter-in-law to Chhanchan, he plans to run away. Umaben tries to stop him but fails. That night, Umaben faints and is rushed to hospital. Manav visits her with Chhanchhan, who calls a doctor and tells him to save Umaben's life. Umaben recovers and finds out that Chhanchhan saved her life, and tells Manav she has accepted Chhanchhan while still hating her and planning to ruin the wedding. Manav tells Chhanchhan's family, who are happy, and the next day Chhanchhan's parents meet Umaben.

Chhanchhan and Manavnow played by Anuj Sachdevamarry happily. Umaben vows to make Chhanchhan leave the house within 30 days after her housewarming party; she unsuccessfully tries to create difficult domestic situations for Chhanchhan. In her sister Rushali's parlor, Chhanchhan meets a girl named Sonali; she and Chhanchhan are surprised to hear that Chhanchhan's husband's and Sonali's fiancé's names are the same. Chhanchhan is shocked to hear Sonali's fiancé's full name is Manav Borisagar. Chhanchhan realises that Umaben is trying to make Manav marry Sonali. Chhanchhan tells Manav about her discovery and next day the pair meet Sonali and ask her fiancé's full name, which Sonali says is Manav Nagar.

Chhanchhan decides to investigate. She leaves Manav's house, goes to her parents' house and starts gathering evidence against Umaben and Sonali. She follows Sonali to a temple where she overhears Umaben telling Sonali she will remove Chhanchhan in one month and make Manav marry Sonali. Chhanchhan records the conversation on her video camera and confronts Umaben about it. Umaben tells Chhanchhan she hates her because she interrupted Poorvi's marriage, accusing Umaben of forcing to give dowry. Umaben also says she fears Chhanchhan's modern thoughts will break the house. Chhnachhan promises to win Umaben's trust and never let her house break.

Kaumudi and Chhanchhan feel the family is drifting apart because of the competition among its members. Umaben leaves for a tirtha yatra. Manav gives Chhanchhan a western dress and asks her to wear it for him. Chhanchhan refuses but later agrees. She is unable to wear the dress to a date with Manav, who gets angry and scolds her for this. Rupali, Manav's friend from college days, enters the scene and taunts Chhanchhan for not satisfying Manav's wishes. Chhanchhan tells Rupali she has no Indian values. Rupali leaves angrily, and later that night telephones Manav and asks him to meet her to discuss a contract she had to give. At their meeting, Rupali proposes to Manav, tells him she loves him and asks him to leave Chhanchhan for her. Manav scolds her and leaves. Rupali plans to avenge Manav.

The next morning, a legal case, stating the family company, Borisagar Enterprises, supplied inferior quality materials, is filed. Manav fights with the claimant Harish in front of the police. Next day, while Manav and Chhanchhan are out on a drive, a bicycle rider wearing a helmet is knocked unconscious as she deliberately collides with Manav's car. The rider is revealed to be Harish, who is declared dead at hospital. Manav is arrested, charged with Harish's murder and gaoled. Chhanchhan realises these events are Rupali's doing and confronts her. The murder charge causes the Borisagar family to lose respect in society. Their business loses money and people insult the family. Umaben is removed as head of mahila sanstha and people seeking Mansi's hand in marriage reject him.

The family realise Harish is alive. Manav records proof of this on his phone and shows it to Rupali. The next day, Rupali hires goons to retrieve the phone. Manav tells Rupali that he gives up and wants her to clean his and his family's name. Chhanchhan calls the police and Rupali is arrested. Having solved their problems, Manav and Chhanchhan live happily.

Cast
Supriya Pathak as Umaben Borisagar,
Anang Desai as Matilalbhai Borisagar
Sanaya Irani as Chhanchhan Sarabhai Borisagar
Farhan Khan / Anuj Sachdeva as Manav Borisagar
Arvind Vaidya as Manav's Grandfather
Rajiv Kumar as Mokut Borisagar
Rohini Banerjee as Kaumudi Borisagar
Romanch Mehta as Manek Borisagar
Deepti Dhyani as Ranjana Borisagar
Jimit Trivedi as Manthan Borisagar
Anushree Bathla as Sanjana Borisagar
Vividha Kriti as Maansi Borisagar
Deepak Pareek as Kartik Sarabha
Anjali Mukhi as Maithali Sarabhai
Shraman Jain as Rugved Sarabhai
Cheshta Mehta as Rushali Sarabhai
Deeya Chopra as Poorvi
Charu Asopa as Simple
Dheeraj Miglani as Himanshu
Tapeshwari Sharma as Sonali
Shruti Bapna as Rupaali
Vishal Solanki as Vineet

Critical response
DNA stated that Chhanchhan has average cinematography, art direction, and costume design, making the show pleasing to the eye, while having to-the-point, realistic dialogues with a decent story pace.
The role of lead Manav Borisagar was approached to Varun Kapoor but later Farhan Khan played it.

References

Sony Entertainment Television original programming
Indian drama television series
Indian television soap operas
2013 Indian television series debuts
2013 Indian television series endings
Television series by Optimystix Entertainment